Radu Scoarță (born 3 July 1999) is a Moldovan footballer who plays as a midfielder. He also holds Russian citizenship.

Club career
He made his Moldovan National Division debut for Zimbru Chișinău on 13 August 2017 in a game against Zaria Bălți.

Notes

References

External links
 

1999 births
Living people
Moldovan footballers
Moldova youth international footballers
FC Zimbru Chișinău players
Moldovan Super Liga players
Association football midfielders
FC Khimki players